Mike Birbiglia (born June 20, 1978) is an American stand-up comedian, actor, storyteller, director, producer and writer. He is a frequent contributor to This American Life and The Moth, and has released several comedy albums and television specials. His feature-length directorial debut Sleepwalk with Me (2012), based on his one-man show of the same name and in which he also starred, won awards at the Sundance and Nantucket film festivals. He also wrote, directed, and starred in the comedy-drama Don't Think Twice (2016). His 2010 book Sleepwalk with Me and Other Painfully True Stories was a New York Times bestseller and a finalist for the 2011 Thurber Prize for American Humor. Birbiglia has appeared in films such as Your Sister's Sister (2011), Cedar Rapids (2011), and Trainwreck (2015), played a recurring role in Orange Is the New Black, Billions and has guest starred in episodes of Girls, Inside Amy Schumer, and Broad City. He also replaced Jimmy Kimmel on his talk show for a week, as Kimmel caught COVID-19.

Early life and education
Birbiglia was born in Shrewsbury, Massachusetts, the son of Mary Jean (née McKenzie), a nurse, and Vincent Paul Birbiglia, a doctor. He is the youngest of four children. He is partially of Italian descent and was raised Catholic. Birbiglia attended the all-boys Catholic school St. John's High School for one year, and graduated from St. Mark's School in 1996. He says seeing comedian Steven Wright perform inspired him to begin writing jokes at age 16. He subsequently attended Georgetown University in Washington, D.C., graduating in 2000. During college he performed as a member of the Georgetown Players Improv Troupe, worked as a server in a comedy club, and began performing at DC Improv (The Improv) in Washington, D.C.

Career

Early career 
Birbiglia began doing improv in 1997. His sister was able to get him an interview on Conan O’Brien's show as an intern, where he worked for associate producer Jordan Schlansky. Birbiglia moved to New York in 2000, and appeared on the Late Show with David Letterman in 2002. He told his first story on stage at the U.S. Comedy Arts Festival in Aspen, in 2003, and eventually became a semi-regular contributor to The Moth storytelling series. He released his first album, Dog Years, in 2004, followed by My Secret Public Album, Volume 1a (2005) a compilation of his appearances on The Bob and Tom Show. His next two albums, Two Drink Mike (2006), and My Secret Public Journal Live (2007) were released on Comedy Central Records. My Secret Public Journal Live was named one of the best comedy albums of the decade by The A.V. Club

In 2008 CBS picked up a sitcom pilot loosely based on Birbiglia's life and featuring himself, Bob Odenkirk and Frances Conroy that ultimately never aired. He later called the failure of his pilot "the luckiest thing that ever happened to me."

Sleepwalk and beyond 
In 2008, Birbiglia opened Sleepwalk with Me, a one-man show that straddled standup comedy and theater, off-Broadway at the Bleecker Street Theater. The show was presented by Nathan Lane, and The New York Times called it "simply perfect". Time Out New York named it their "Show of the Year" in 2009.

Birbiglia adapted his material into the 2010 book Sleepwalk with Me, and Other Painfully True Stories and the 2011 album Sleepwalk With Me Live. The book debuted at #29 on the hardcover nonfiction New York Times Bestseller List and number four on the hardcover nonfiction section of the Washington Post Political Bookworm Best Sellers. The book was also a finalist for the 2011 Thurber Prize for American Humor. Sleepwalk With Me Live debuted at #1 on the Billboard Comedy Charts.

Birbiglia made his directorial debut with Sleepwalk with Me, based on his one-man show and which he wrote, directed, and starred in. The film premiered at the 2012 Sundance Film Festival and won the NEXT Audience Award. It was selected in the "Festival Favorites" category at the South by Southwest film festival in Austin, Texas  and also appeared in the Nantucket Film Festival where it won the award for best writer/director. The film was produced by Jacob Jaffke and This American Life'''s Ira Glass and stars Birbiglia, Lauren Ambrose, Carol Kane, James Rebhorn, and Cristin Milioti and has cameos by Glass, Kristen Schaal, Wyatt Cenac, David Wain, Jessi Klein, John Lutz and Marc Maron. While hosting the 2012 Gotham Awards, Birbiglia roasted I Heart Huckabees director David O. Russell by reading a transcript of Russell's on-set argument with actress Lily Tomlin. The event, specifically the joke and what transpired after it, later formed a large part of Birbiglia's show, Thank God for Jokes.

In addition to starring in Sleepwalk with Me, Birbiglia has appeared in films such as Trainwreck, Going the Distance, Cedar Rapids, Your Sister's Sister and The Fault in Our Stars. He has also guest-starred in episodes of Girls, Inside Amy Schumer, and Broad City. He played the role of Oscar Langstraat in the third and fifth seasons of Showtime's hit show Billions and Danny Pearson on the Netflix series Orange Is the New Black in its third and fourth seasons, with which he shared the 2016 Screen Actors Guild Award for Outstanding Performance by an Ensemble in a Comedy Series.

In 2011, Birbiglia mounted his second one-man show, My Girlfriend's Boyfriend, which ran for four months off-Broadway and won the Lucille Lortel Award for Outstanding Solo Show. He toured My Girlfriend's Boyfriend around the world with tour dates in the United States, Australia, Canada and the United Kingdom. On June 2, 2013, Birbiglia performed it for the last time at Carnegie Hall. My Girlfriend's Boyfriend was featured as the number one stand-up special of 2013 by Vulture, Paste, The Laugh Button and Laughspin. It was also named one of Time Out New York's Best Comedy Specials of 2013. Flavorwire listed the special as one of the top 20 funniest stand-up specials of all time.

For his second film, Birbiglia drew upon his early experience with improv in Don't Think Twice (2016), which centers on a fictional Manhattan improv troupe. Birbligia also stars among an ensemble cast including Keegan-Michael Key, Gillian Jacobs, Kate Micucci, Tami Sagher, and Chris Gethard. The film was nominated for several awards, including the Critics' Choice Award for Best Comedy and St. Louis Film Critics Association award for Best Comedy.

Birbiglia's Thank God for Jokes comedy special was released on Netflix on February 28, 2017.

In April 2017, Birbiglia announced a tour of his newest show titled The New One. The tour started with 25 cities and, in December 2017, featured a limited podcast titled The Old Ones. The podcast features Mike Birbiglia analyzing his old stand-up with guests including his brother Joe Birbiglia, comedians Pete Holmes and John Mulaney, film producer and director Judd Apatow, contributor to 'This American Life' Ira Glass and his wife. The New One made its off-Broadway debut at the Cherry Lane Theatre on July 26 and was scheduled to run through August 2 before a high demand for tickets extended the show's run to and through August 26.

The show then received a Broadway transfer, with performances beginning October 25, 2018 and running through January 20, 2019 at the Cort Theatre.

In March 2020, Birbiglia created a charity initiative called "Tip Your Waitstaff" with fellow comics to raise money for comedy clubs closed because of COVID-19.

Birbiglia is a regular contributor to the Public Radio International-distributed program This American Life.

Birbiglia temporarily replaced Jimmy Kimmel for a brief while in 2022, as Kimmel recovered from COVID-19. 

In 2022, Birbiglia premiered his show titled The Old Man and the Pool at the Steppenwolf Theatre Company, where it ran from April 28 to May 22. He later opened the show on Broadway at the Vivian Beaumont Theater, where it ran from November 13, 2022 to January 15, 2023.

Personal life
Birbiglia has rapid eye movement sleep behavior disorder, which once caused him to run out of a second-story window of a motel he was staying in Walla Walla, Washington while on tour. As a result of the accident, Birbiglia received 33 stitches in his leg. His show and subsequent film Sleepwalk with Me largely centers around this event. He also had a tumor on his bladder at the age of 19.

Birbiglia is married to Jen Stein, whose pen name is J. Hope Stein, and whose work is featured in The New One. They have one daughter.

Filmography
Film

Television

Standup specials

Music videos

Discography
Audio releases (physical and/or digital formats)
 Main
 2004: Dog Years (out of print) (self-produced, winner of the "Just Plain Folks" comedy album of the year)
 2005: My Secret Public Album (the best of Birbiglia's "Secret Public Journals" weekly guest spots on The Bob and Tom Show)
 2006: Two Drink Mike 2007: My Secret Public Journal Live 2011: Sleepwalk with Me Live 2013: My Girlfriend's Boyfriend 2019: Thank God For Jokes (vinyl)

 Compilations
 2005: Invite Them Up'' (Comedy Central Records CD/DVD compilation of indie comics)

Awards and nominations

References

External links

 
 This American Life contributions
 
 
 
 Mike Birbiglia's Working It Out podcast

1978 births
American writers of Italian descent
American male comedians
American male film actors
American comedy musicians
American stand-up comedians
Georgetown University alumni
Living people
People from Shrewsbury, Massachusetts
St. Mark's School (Massachusetts) alumni
Musicians from Massachusetts
Male actors from Massachusetts
21st-century American male actors
Comedians from Massachusetts
21st-century American comedians
Film directors from Massachusetts
Screenwriters from Massachusetts
Articles containing video clips
21st-century American screenwriters
American people of Italian descent